The Embassy of Bahrain in Washington, D.C. is the diplomatic mission of the  Kingdom of Bahrain to the United States. It is located at 3502 International Drive, Northwest, Washington, D.C., in the North Cleveland Park neighborhood. The ambassador  is Shaikh Abdullah Bin Rashid Al Khalifa.

The embassy also operates a Consulate-General in New York City which serves as a permanent Bahraini mission to the United Nations. As of 2019, the permanent representative was Jamal Fares Alrowaiei.

History
Bahrain and the United States established diplomatic ties in 1971 after Bahrain declared independence from the United Kingdom. The U.S. established its embassy in the Bahraini capital Manama on 21 September 1971 whereas the Bahraini embassy in Washington D.C. was opened in 1977.

See also
 Bahrain–United States relations
 Diplomatic missions of Bahrain
 Ambassadors of Bahrain to the United States
 Embassy of the United States, Manama
 Ambassadors of the United States to Bahrain

References

External links

 Official website
 wikimapia

1977 establishments in Washington, D.C.
Bahrain
Washington, D.C.
Bahrain–United States relations
North Cleveland Park